The king dory or lookdown dory (Cyttus traversi) is a Dory, in the genus Cyttus, found around South Africa, southern Australia, and New Zealand, over the continental shelf at depths of between 200 and 800 m.  Its length is between 20 and 40 cm.

References 

 
 Tony Ayling & Geoffrey Cox, Collins Guide to the Sea Fishes of New Zealand,  (William Collins Publishers Ltd, Auckland, New Zealand 1982) 

Cyttidae
Fish described in 1872
Taxa named by Frederick Hutton (scientist)